Gyöngyösi Kézilabda Klub  is a Hungarian handball club from Gyöngyös, that plays in the  Nemzeti Bajnokság I, the top level championship in Hungary.

The current name of the club is B|Braun Gyöngyös due to sponsorship reasons.

Crest, colours, supporters

Naming history

Kit manufacturers and shirt sponsor
The following table shows in detail Gyöngyösi KK kit manufacturers and shirt sponsors by year:

Kits

Supporters and rivalries
The supporters of the club are based in Gyöngyös, in western part of Heves County, Hungary.

Gyöngyösi KK's arch-rival is the neighbouring club Eger-Eszterházy SzSE and games between the clubs are considered as the "Heves megyei derbi".
Gyöngyösi KK's arch-rival is the neighbouring club Mezőkövesdi KC and games between the clubs.

Sports Hall information

Name: – Dr. Fejes András Sport- és Rendezvénycsarnok
City: – Gyöngyös
Capacity: – 1500
Address: – 3200 Gyöngyös, Kiss Péter utca 2.

Management

Team

Current squad 

Squad for the 2022–23 season

Technical staff
 Head coach:  Balázs Bíró
 Assistant coach:  Ákos Sándor
 Goalkeeping coach:  Henrik Hudák
 Fitness coach:  Tamás Németh
 Masseur:  Balázs Unger
 Club doctor:  Dr.János Szívós

Transfers
Transfers for the 2022–23 season

Joining 
  László Bartucz (GK) from  Grundfos Tatabánya KC
  Martin Potisk (CB) from  ThSV Eisenach
  Lucian Bura (RB) from  HRK Gorica
  Norbert Jóga (LP) from  Sport36-Komló
  Máté Menyhárt (LW) from  Kecskeméti TE
  Péter Schmid (CB) from  Budakalász FKC
  Zsolt Schäffer (RB) from  Csurgói KK
  Máté Lakosy (RW) from  SBS-Eger

Leaving 
  Mitar Markez (RB) to  Csurgói KK
 Uroš Vilovski (LP) to  Grundfos Tatabánya KC
  Dávid Ubornyák (CB) to  Grundfos Tatabánya KC
  Benedek Nagy (GK) loan back to  Telekom Veszprém
  Ľubomír Ďuriš (CB) to  MŠK Považská Bystrica
  Bence Papp (RB) to  Budakalász FKC
  Pál Merkovszki (GK) to  Budai Farkasok KKUK
  Marko Vasić (RW) to  RK Vojvodina
  Bálint Rosta (LP) on loan at  ETO-SZESE Győr

Previous squads

Top scorers

Honours

Individual awards

Domestic
Nemzeti Bajnokság I Top Scorer

Recent seasons

Seasons in Nemzeti Bajnokság I: 12
Seasons in Nemzeti Bajnokság I/B:

European competition

European record
As of 30 September 2021:

EHF ranking

Former club members

Notable former players

 Arián Andó
 Ádám Bajorhegyi
 Dávid Bakos
 György Bakos
 Zsolt Balogh
 Csaba Bendó
 József Czina
 Dávid Debreczeni
 Ákos Doros
 Tamás Frey
 Tibor Gazdag
 Péter Gúnya
 Tamás Habuczki
 Gábor Hajdú
 Márk Hegedűs
 Balázs Holló
 Henrik Hudák
 Ádám Iváncsik
 Károly Juhász
 Pál Kenyeres
 Imre Kiss
 András Koncz
 Attila Kotormán
 Péter Kovacsics
 Milorad Krivokapić
 Ákos Lele
 Szilveszter Liszkai
 Bence Nagy
 Levente Nagy
 Ádám Országh
 Krisztián Patócskai
 Zsolt Perger
 István Rosta
 Ákos Sándor
Péter Szabó
 Gábor Szalafai
 Zsolt Szobol
 Ádám Tóth
 Mihály Tóth
 Dávid Ubornyák
 Milán Varsandán
 Dino Hamidović (2021–)
 Mirko Herceg
 Vladan Lončar
 Henrique Pedro Martins
 Malandrin De Oliveira Rodolfo
 Ivan Dumenčić
 Tomáš Řezníček (2016–2017)
 Manuel Catalina Falcon
 Atsushi Mekaru
 Zlatko Dimitrovski
 Miralem Bećirović
 Tibor Ivanišević
 Marko Jovetić
 Mitar Markez
 Savo Mešter
 Petar Papić
 Milan Rasic
 Milan Šajin
 Aleksandar Tomić (2021–)
 Darko Trivković
 Ľubomír Ďuriš
 Jozef Hanták
 Marian Kleis
 Michal Kopčo (2007–2009)
 Michal Meluš
 Matej Mikita (2016–2018)
 Gabriel Vadkerti
 Alexander Semikov

Former coaches

References

External links
 Official website 

Hungarian handball clubs
Heves County